"Cold Cuts" is the 62nd episode of the HBO original series The Sopranos and the 10th of the show's fifth season. Written by Robin Green and Mitchell Burgess, and directed by Mike Figgis, it originally aired on May 9, 2004.

Starring
 James Gandolfini as Tony Soprano
 Lorraine Bracco as Dr. Jennifer Melfi 
 Edie Falco as Carmela Soprano
 Michael Imperioli as Christopher Moltisanti
 Dominic Chianese as Corrado Soprano, Jr. *  
 Steven Van Zandt as Silvio Dante
 Tony Sirico as Paulie Gualtieri
 Robert Iler as Anthony Soprano, Jr. *
 Jamie-Lynn DiScala as Meadow Soprano *
 Drea de Matteo as Adriana La Cerva
 Aida Turturro as Janice Soprano Baccalieri
 Steven R. Schirripa as Bobby Baccalieri
 Vincent Curatola as Johnny Sack
 and Steve Buscemi as Tony Blundetto

* = credit only

Guest starring

Synopsis

Tony and Johnny meet about a missing load of smuggled Vespa scooters that were supposed to be received by Carlo Gervasi's crew and split between the two families. Johnny denies any knowledge about the Vespas and makes a pointed reference to Tony's continued denial that Tony B was involved in the hit on Joey. Tony suspects Johnny seized the whole shipment for himself and sends Benny and a member of Carlo's crew to the port to investigate. They brutally interrogate a security guard, who tells them that Phil took the scooters. A shipment of expensive Italian cheeses is coming in; fearing more financial losses, Tony loses his temper in front of his crew.

Tony asks Tony B and Christopher to remove three bodies from Uncle Pat Blundetto's farm in Kinderhook, New York, which is about to have new owners. Chris complains to Adriana about the two Tonys' past treatment of him. Adriana suggests they leave New Jersey and start over elsewhere, but Chris replies that he is a soldier for life. Despite early tensions, Chris and Tony B bond as they gradually dispose of the bodies. However, when Tony comes to oversee the completion of the job, the two older men fall back into their routine of picking on Chris, with Tony making fun of Chris's sobriety. Chris passes up an opportunity to go hunting with them and leaves the farm early the next morning, driving home in tears.

Tony returns to the Bada Bing and, prompted by a TV program he has seen, talks about terrorist threats tied to unexamined cargo containers at the ports. When Georgie Santorelli responds by saying "that's why you gotta live for today," Tony suddenly explodes in fury and gives him a beating that sends him to the hospital and causes some permanent hearing loss. Afterward, Tony is remorseful, and gives Paulie a wad of bills and insists that he make sure Georgie receives the best care. Paulie then tells Tony that Georgie is quitting his job at the Bing and doesn't want to see him again.

Carmela continues to be hostile towards Tony and drains the water from their house's pool to keep him from swimming there. After another fight, they agree to organize an engagement party for Meadow and Finn. When she runs into Mr. Wegler at A.J.'s school, she surprises herself by saying that she is moving back in with her husband, but later insists to Rosalie that she has no such intention.
 
Janice is arrested after assaulting another mother at her stepdaughter's soccer game. Tony is infuriated over the publicity brought to his family and storms into Janice's house late at night, demanding she plead guilty to the charges and that Bobby "take control" of his wife. Citing her recent bellicose behavior, Bobby gives Janice an ultimatum to either see an anger management specialist or end their marriage. Janice starts attending anger management classes and tells Tony that they have helped her make tremendous progress; Tony says he is happy for her. The "Soprano temper" becomes the focus of Tony's next session with Dr. Melfi, who observes that both depression and anger are traits in the Soprano family.

Tony joins Janice and Bobby for dinner but becomes irritated when he sees his newly placid sister deal calmly with a series of minor annoyances. He breaks the calm by provoking her with sarcastic and increasingly hurtful comments about her estranged son, Harpo. Janice soon gets enraged and chases Tony round the room with a fork in her fist. Smiling to himself, he leaves.

First appearances
Uncle Pat Blundetto: Tony S and Tony B's uncle who was given early retirement from the DiMeo crime family because of health issues. He settled on a large farm in Kinderhook, New York, where he was often visited by his nephews Christopher, Tony S, and Tony B during their childhoods.

Title reference
Tony tells Dr. Melfi that "revenge is like serving cold cuts" (inadvertently mangling the adage "Revenge is a dish best served cold"). In the episode, Johnny Sack continues to interfere with Soprano business in retribution for the murder of "Joey Peeps."
In a scene at Uncle Pat's farm, Christopher, Pat, and Tony B eat cold-cut sandwiches for lunch.
The title may also refer to the dead bodies Tony B and Christopher are looking for in this episode.

Connections to previous episodes
 Christopher and Tony Blundetto dig up and dispose of Emil Kolar's skeleton, moving his body for the second time. Christopher shot and killed Emil in the Pilot episode. Then, he and Pussy Bonpensiero unsuccessfully tried to put Emil's body into a dumpster. Later, they buried the body under a bridge somewhere. But, the burial was giving Christopher nightmares. So, Christopher and Georgie later dug up the body and relocated it in "The Legend of Tennessee Moltisanti."
 When Tony confronts Janice over the assault, she tells him that the woman is lucky she didn't kill her. Tony responds, "Well, we know that." This refers to the killing of Richie Aprile by Janice in "The Knight in White Satin Armor."
 The woman Tony sleeps with was previously encountered in "Irregular Around the Margins" as an employee of the dermatologist's office where his cancerous mole was removed.
 Tony previously assaulted Georgie in Season 1, Episode 2 "46 Long." Exasperated by Georgie's clumsy way of handling a phone call, Tony took the phone and bashed him on the head with it.

Other cultural references
 Of Johnny Sack's belief that Tony Blundetto killed "Joey Peeps," Silvio comments that Sack should be "out looking for the real killers, instead of spending all his time on the golf course."  This line is a not-so-subtle jab at O. J. Simpson, who in the years after his acquittal on murder charges claimed to be seeking "the real killers" while he was often criticized for spending much of his free time playing golf.
 Dr. Melfi quotes W.B. Yeats' "The Second Coming" during a session with Tony in this episode. This poem will later be used prominently in Season 6 (including an episode titled "The Second Coming").
 Tony mentions to Dr. Melfi that John Gotti had a bad temper when he tells her about Janice going to anger management.
 On the drive to Kinderhook, Tony B confides to Christopher: "that 'Legend of Sleepy Hollow' cartoon used to scare the piss out of me" and adds that  "very sorry people" used to call Tony B Ichabod Crane. According to a notation by Washington Irving, the character of Ichabod Crane was based on a schoolteacher whom Irving befriended in Kinderhook, New York, in 1809.
 In the audio commentary, the episode's director, Mike Figgis, points out how the scene where Christopher and Tony Blundetto dig up the skeletal remains of a man Christopher knew (and killed) symbolically referenced the famous Yorick scene in Hamlet.
 Christopher, as in episodes before, once again mistakenly calls Emil Kolar a Czechoslovakian when, in fact, he was a Czech-American. Paulie Walnuts once confused Chechens with Czechoslovakians in "Pine Barrens."
 When Uncle Pat remembers where the missing bodies are buried, Christopher likens him to Johnny Mnemonic.
 When Tony is flipping channels, obscure Cartoon Network show Whatever Happened to... Robot Jones? is seen on the TV.
 At a diner, Tony B mentions to Tony that Christopher has the same car (Hummer H2) as Schwarzenegger. Tony then, in a malapropism (the way Schwarzenegger did), calls it "the Humvee."
 The voice on the TV program about terrorist threats to ports is Jim Lehrer of the PBS NewsHour.
 Tony misquotes the Phoebe Snow song "Harpo's Blues" (from her eponymous 1974 album) as "Harpo's Song" when he is deliberately attempting to provoke Janice during this episode's final scene.
 At dinner, when Bobby Jr. makes reference to a “...G5. It has 64-bit...” he is referring to a Power Mac G5.

Music
 The piano song played at the wedding shop visited by Christopher and Adriana is "Music Box Dancer," written by Frank Mills.
 The song played at the Bada Bing! before Tony beats Georgie up is "Stop" by Joe Henry, which Henry's sister-in-law Madonna has performed as "Don't Tell Me".
 The song played over the end credits is a live version of "I'm Not Like Everybody Else" by The Kinks, which is featured in their 1994 album To the Bone.

References

External links
"Cold Cuts"  at HBO

The Sopranos (season 5) episodes
2004 American television episodes